Moreton Corbet and Lee Brockhurst is a civil parish in Shropshire, England.  It contains 45 listed buildings that are recorded in the National Heritage List for England.  Of these, three are listed at Grade I, the highest of the three grades, two are at Grade II*, the middle grade, and the others are at Grade II, the lowest grade.  The parish contains the villages and smaller settlements of Acton Reynald, Moreton Corbet, Lee Brockhurst, and Preston Brockhurst, and the surrounding countryside.  Most of the listed buildings are houses and cottages, farmhouses and farm buildings and associated structures, the earliest of which are timber framed.  The other listed buildings include churches, memorials, a ruined castle and mansion, country houses and associated structures, a former watermill, a bridge, and two mileposts.


Key

Buildings

References

Citations

Sources

Lists of buildings and structures in Shropshire